X7 was a series of electric railcars operated by Statens Järnvägar (SJ) of Sweden as local trains. 26 motor cars were built, with an additional 22 trailers, by ASEA in 1949–51. They were put into service on the predecessors to the Skåne and Gothenburg commuter rail systems. The X7 was in service until 1983, when it was replaced with X10.

External links
Järnväg.net on X7 

ASEA multiple units
X07
Railcars of Sweden

15 kV AC multiple units